Urban Search and Rescue Utah Task Force 1 (UT-TF 1) is one of 28 Federal Emergency Management Agency (FEMA) Urban Search & Rescue Task Forces in the United States. The task force is based in Salt Lake City, Utah and is managed by the Unified Fire Authority. Activation of the task force is accomplished by the State of Utah, or FEMA for rapid deployment of the Task Force, modular or single US&R resources. The task force is self-sufficient for up to 72 hours and includes physicians, search dogs, heavy rescue technicians firefighters and paramedics, and structural engineers. The Task Force manages 6.3 million dollars in specialized vehicles and equipment that is maintained by personnel trained by FEMA.

Urban Search & Rescue
Urban search and rescue (US&R) involves the location, rescue (extrication), and initial medical stabilization of victims trapped in confined spaces. Structural collapse is most often the cause of victims being trapped, but victims may also be trapped in transportation accidents and mine and trench collapses.

Urban search and rescue is considered a "multi-hazard" discipline, as it may be needed for a variety of emergencies or disasters including earthquakes, hurricanes, typhoons, storms and tornadoes, floods, dam failures, technological accidents, terrorist activities, and hazardous materials releases. The events may be slow in developing, as in the case of hurricanes, or sudden, as in the case of earthquakes.

Deployments
UT-TF 1 was deployed to the World Trade Center on September 11, 2001, Hurricane Katrina site in 2005, 2013 Colorado floods in September 2013, Hurricane Harvey in August 2017 and numerous other federal and local responses.

US&R Incident Support Team (IST)
UT-TF 1 membership holds rostered positions on the FEMA US&R IST.  This overhead team, the National Urban Search and Rescue (US&R) Incident Support Team (IST) provides a group of highly qualified specialists readily available for rapid assembly and deployment to a disaster area. The IST furnishes Federal, State, and local officials with technical assistance in acquiring and using US&R resources. It provides advice, incident command assistance, management and coordination of US&R task forces, and US&R logistics support.

References

External links

Urban Search and Rescue Task Forces